Ontario Morning is a Canadian radio program, which airs as the CBC Radio One local morning program for non-metropolitan markets in Southern Ontario. While the network's main stations in Toronto, Ottawa, Waterloo Region, Windsor and London each produce their own city-oriented morning programs, nearly all Radio One rebroadcasters in smaller markets air Ontario Morning in place of their host station's program.

The program is produced from the studios of CBLA-FM at the Canadian Broadcasting Centre in Toronto, although it does not air on that station's primary transmitter in Toronto.

Ramraajh Sharvendiran is the program's host as of May 2022. Past hosts have included Sue Prestedge, Jane Hawtin, Joe Coté, Avril Benoit, Dave Seglins, Erika Ritter, Lorne Saxberg, Martina Fitzgerald, Wei Chen and Julianne Hazlewood.

References

External links
 Official website

CBC Radio One programs
Canadian talk radio programs